Russell M. Church (December 24, 1930 – May 24, 2021) was an American psychologist, who was the Edgar L. Marston professor of psychology at Brown University, having formerly served as the Charles Pitts Robinson and John Palmer Barstow Professor from 1993 to 1999.

Church received his A.B. from the University of Michigan in 1952 and his A.M. and Ph.D. from Harvard University in 1954 and 1956.

References

External links

1930 births
2021 deaths
21st-century American psychologists
Brown University faculty
Harvard University alumni
University of Michigan alumni